Valle Hermoso is a small town in the province of Córdoba, Argentina, located  from the city of Córdoba and  from Buenos Aires.

Valle Hermoso ('Beautiful Valley') is one of a number of small towns straddling Route 38 and the now disused railway line, which runs through the Punilla Valley from the south, and the city of Córdoba, north to La Rioja.  The town's central district contains commercial stores and a number of hotels.

Valle Hermoso sits at an altitude of about  providing a temperate climate. It is high enough to moderate summer heat yet low enough that winters are mild.  Tourism peaks during the summer months of December through February when town population can double. Several large, old, hotels, such as El Peñón and El Castillo are in the area. Hotel Vaquerías, over a century old, sits in a hillside niche with artesian springs, swimming, and horseback riding.

"Vaquerías" or "place of cattle" is a natural funnel where vaqueros (cowboys) would drive the cattle from the grazing pastures for branding, birthing, or collection.  Today, La Reserva Natural de Vaquerías is a nature preserve dedicated to preventing construction at or alteration of the area's natural environment, fauna and flora.

References

Córdoba Serrana: Valle Hermoso 

Populated places in Córdoba Province, Argentina
Tourism in Argentina
Populated places established in 1921
Cities in Argentina
Argentina
Córdoba Province, Argentina